A referendum on holding early parliamentary elections was held in Slovakia on 3 April 2004. Although approved by 87.9% of those voting, voter turnout was just 35.9% and the referendum was declared invalid due to insufficient turnout.

Results

References

2004 referendums
Referendums in Slovakia
2004 in Slovakia
April 2004 events in Europe